Hasli Izwan Amir Hasan (born 22 February 1977 in Ipoh) is a Malaysian sport shooter. He won two medals, gold and silver, in the men's rapid fire pistol at the Southeast Asian Games (2005 in Manila, Philippines, and 2007 in Bangkok, Thailand). He also captured a silver medal in the same event at the 2007 Asian Shooting Championships in Kuwait City, Kuwait, with a total score of 776.6 points, earning him a spot on the Malaysian team for the Olympics.

Hasan represented Malaysia at the 2008 Summer Olympics in Beijing, where he competed in the men's 25 m rapid fire pistol. He finished only in fifteenth place by one point behind Czech Republic's Martin Podhráský, with a total score of 564 points (279 on the first stage, and 285 on the second).

References

External links
NBC Olympics Profile

Malaysian male sport shooters
Living people
Olympic shooters of Malaysia
Shooters at the 2008 Summer Olympics
People from Ipoh
1977 births
People from Perak
Malaysian people of Malay descent
Malaysian Muslims
Shooters at the 2006 Asian Games
Shooters at the 2010 Asian Games
Commonwealth Games medallists in shooting
Commonwealth Games silver medallists for Malaysia
Commonwealth Games bronze medallists for Malaysia
Southeast Asian Games gold medalists for Malaysia
Southeast Asian Games silver medalists for Malaysia
Southeast Asian Games medalists in shooting
Shooters at the 2006 Commonwealth Games
Shooters at the 2010 Commonwealth Games
Competitors at the 2005 Southeast Asian Games
Competitors at the 2007 Southeast Asian Games
Asian Games competitors for Malaysia
21st-century Malaysian people
Medallists at the 2006 Commonwealth Games
Medallists at the 2010 Commonwealth Games